The 2012 Atlantic Championship Series season was the first season of the revived Atlantic Championship. The series was organised by Formula Race Promotions under the sanctioning of SCCA Pro Racing. Hoosier was introduced as the series spec tire. David Grant racing for Polestar Racing Group won the championship. After this season the series went on probation to return in 2014.

Drivers and teams

Race calendar and results

Final standings

See also
 2012 F1600 Championship Series season
 2012 F2000 Championship Series season

References

External links
 Official website
 2012 Atlantic Championship Series on DriverDB.com

Atlantic Season 2012
Atlantic Championship seasons